Attorney General Ball may refer to:

Byron D. Ball, Michigan Attorney General from 1873 to 1874
John Thomas Ball (1815–1898), Attorney-General for Ireland
Nicholas Ball (lawyer) (1791–1865), Attorney-General for Ireland